"" (No country more beautiful in this time) is a popular Volkslied in German. It goes back to a song by Anton Wilhelm von Zuccalmaglio, first published in 1840 in a folk song collection. It gained popularity in the 1910s in the Wandervogel movement, and is now part of most song books in German. It has been set to choral music and modern songs. The beginning of the first line has been used as the title of books, a play and television series.

History 
In 1840, Anton Wilhelm von Zuccalmaglio published in the second volume of a collection of Volkslieder which was begun by Andreas Kretzschmer, entitled Deutsche Volkslieder mit ihren Original-Weisen (German folk songs with their original tunes), 382 songs which he collected himself, according to his preface. Some of the songs, however, were written and composed by Zuccalmaglio in the sense of a romantic Volkslied concept ("im Sinne eines romantischen Volksliedkonzeptes"). These include "", which he published under the title Abendlied (Evening Song) on page 494 as No. 274. It is marked as "Vom Niederrhein" (from Lower Rhenania), probably invented by the author.

After "" was included in the 1912 song book Unsere Lieder (Our Songs) of the Austrian Wandervogel, it gained popularity in the Wandervogel movement. This popularity resulted in several different text versions in the 1920s, such as a socialist version in 1929, and a version for Protestant girls and women. The song has been included in most collections of songs in German.

Text 
The poem's four stanzas are in five lines each, rhyming AABBA. The song, speaking in the first person plural, celebrates the ideal of a gathering of friends on a summer evening in nature ("Idealbild freundschaftlicher Zusammenkünfte an Sommerabenden in freier Natur"), singing together. The singers express admiration of the beautiful country, and hope for similar gatherings in the future, God's grace permitting. They finally wish each other a good night under God's protection.

The  melody consists of elements from various Volkslieder, such as "Ich kann und mag nicht fröhlich sein" and "Ade, mein Schatz, ich muss nun fort". The last three lines are repeated.
1. Kein schöner Land in dieser Zeit
als hier das unsre weit und breit,
wo wir uns finden
wohl untern Linden
zur Abendzeit.

2. Da haben wir so manche Stund
gesessen da in froher Rund
und taten singen,
die Lieder klingen
im Eichengrund.

3. Dass wir uns hier in diesem Tal
noch treffen so viel hundertmal,
Gott mag es schenken,
Gott mag es lenken,
er hat die Gnad.

4. Jetzt, Brüder, eine gute Nacht,
der Herr im hohen Himmel wacht;
in seiner Güten
uns zu behüten,
ist er bedacht!
1. There is no land, near and far,
more beautiful than ours at this time
when we gather
under the Linden trees
as night falls.

2. There we sat many hours
in a joyful circle
and sang,
the songs resound
in the oak grove.

3. May we meet again
in this valley many hundred times.
God may gift it,
God may grant it,
he has the grace.

4. Now brothers we wish you a good night,
the Lord up in Heaven is keeping watch.
In his goodness
he is prepared
to protect us.

Melody

Adaptations 
The melody was used in choral works such as Hans Lang's Kein schöner Land, a play for a two-part youth choir, Otto Jochum's An die Heimat: sein Werk beschauend., Op. 152, a suite of variations, and Hermann Erdlen's Kleine Hausmusik zum Singen und Spielen über das Volkslied "Kein schöner Land". The song was set for choirs often. Modern arrangements include 's "Ein schönes Land" (1963) and a version of the folk-rock group Ougenweide (1980).

The first line was used for song books, recording collections and television, including the series by Günter Wewel,  about regions, and the political satire in six episodes  directed by Klaus Emmerich after a script by Elke Heidenreich and Bernd Schroeder. Ein deutscher Umweltatlas, a German atlas of environment by Emanuel Eckardt, and Kein schöner Land. Die Zerstörung der sozialen Gerechtigkeit, about the destruction of social justice, by Heribert Prantl.

References

Further reading 

 
 Walter Wiora: Die rheinisch-bergischen Melodien bei Zuccalmaglio und Brahms. Voggenreiter, Bad Godesberg 1953.
 Helmut Jensen: Bergisches Liederbuch. Ein praktisches Sing- und Musizierbuch. Heider, Bergisch Gladbach 1990, .

Volkslied